Pommera is a commune in the Pas-de-Calais department in the Hauts-de-France region of France.

Geography

Population

Places of interest
 The church of St.Marguerite, dating from the nineteenth century.
 The  18th century Château de Pommera
 The Château de Grena dating from the eighteenth century.
 A chapel.

See also
Communes of the Pas-de-Calais department

References

Communes of Pas-de-Calais